Adoxophyes fasciculana, the bell moth or orange tip moth, is a moth of the family Tortricidae. It was described by Francis Walker in 1866 from the Moluccas. It is also known from South Asia, Vietnam, Australia and the Pacific Islands. It is a polyphagous pest on several commercially important crops.

Description
The wingspan is 14–18 mm, with females being larger than males. The forewing ground colour is yellowish with a sinuous pattern in rusty or ginger brown. The hindwings are yellow fawn.

Larval food plants
Ageratum conyzoides
Amaranthus viridis
Arachis hypogaea
Averrhoa carambola
Camellia limonia
Camellia sinensis
Carica papaya
Emilia longifolia
Euphorbia hirta
Euphorbia longan
Gnaphalium indicum
Gossypium barbadense
Helianthus annuus
Indigofera endecaphylla
Ipomoea batatas
Litchi chinensis
Morus alba
Passiflora foetida
Ricinus communis
Rosa rugosa
Scutellaria barbata

References

Moths described in 1866
Adoxophyes
Moths of Oceania
Moths of Asia